The Blake Street hoard is a Romano-British coin hoard.

The hoard

Discovery and context
The hoard was discovered during excavation in 1975 by Richard Hall at Blake Street, York, in the praetentura of the Roman legionary fortress of Eboracum. The hoard was located in the foundations of a building dating to the second-century AD.

33 of the coins are in the collection of the Yorkshire Museum and two are in the British Museum.

Contents
The hoard contains 35 denarii from the Roman Republican and early-Imperial periods. The latest coin in the hoard is of the Emperor Vespasian.

References

1975 in England
1975 archaeological discoveries
Archaeological sites in North Yorkshire
Collections of the Yorkshire Museum
Hoards from Roman Britain
Coin hoards